Chochukmo is a 5-piece indie rock band based in Hong Kong, with Jan Curious on vocal, Mike Orange on guitar and synthesizer, Les Hunter on guitar, Fai on bass, and Kitty Trouble on drums and percussion. Formed in the summer of 2005, the band has experienced a few member changes, with the current line-up formed in the spring of 2008. The band's sound is always being described as a genre-blender, experimenting rock with some other different styles of music. The band is generally being categorized as indie rock while some considered the band's style as math rock.

History

First generation (2005–2006)
In the summer of 2005, Jan Curious (from League of Heroes) and Mike Orange (from Homework) suddenly came up with an idea of having a side-project when they're jamming at a studio, while at that moment they were both belonged to different bands. With the joining of bassist Yanyan Pang (from Hard Candy) and drummer Cheong Ho (from Innisfallen), the first generation of Chochukmo was officially formed, with its sound characterized by punk and garage rock influences. Considering the band as solely a side-project, the members of the band had no plan of recording anything. In the spring of 2006, guitarist Mike Orange decided to leave the band due to his personal reasons.

Second generation (2006–2008)
As guitarist Mike Orange departed, Ka-sing Law was then being recruited as the new guitarist. The band has toured to Manila, Philippines in 2007, and had their self-recorded demo CD distributed there. In the spring of 2008, guitarist Ka-shing Law and drummer Cheong Ho decided to leave the band to concentrate on their own music projects.

Third generation (2008–present)
With the joining of new guitarist Les Hunter (formerly from An id signal) and new drummer Kitty Trouble (former from League of Heroes), plus the return of former guitarist Mike Orange, Chochukmo has come into a 5-piece. With no intention to play any formerly written songs (except the track "Caroline"), the members came into a new set of songs and had their debut gig in July 2008. The band has made part of a compilation album released by The Underground HK by contributing 2 tracks to the double CD album. The band was then being selected as "Top 20 musicians in Hong Kong" by Time Out Hong Kong, along with the acclaimed musician Anthony Wong Yiu-Ming and alternative singer Denise Ho.

The band has been touring to Manila, Philippines (with Carina Ho on bass and Chi-kin Wan on drum) and Kuala Lumpur, Malaysia in 2009, alongside some indie bands around Asia such as I am David Sparkle, Free Love, Everybody Loves Irene etc. Bassist Yanyan Pang announced her departure after the Malaysia tour, due to the creativity differences. With no replacement to the bassist position, Alvin Lo came into the band as a supporting bassist.

The band has won the "We'll Make Your Album" contest hosted by Time Out Hong Kong and Diesel in September 2009, which the contest promised to release an album for the winning band. Chochukmo was chosen as the winner by a team of judges including Kelvin Avon, Anthony Wong Yiu-Ming, Wong Ka Keung and Wong Chi-Chung. With the support from Time Out Hong Kong and Diesel, the band then released its debut album The King Lost His Pink on 28 November 2009, with the album mixed and mastered by Kenneth Tse from The invisible Men, and the album cover designed and painted by Simon Birch.

Being described as "The most charismatic band to have emerged in southern China in recent years" by Time magazine, the band has been selected into the "Hong Kong Top List: 20 people to watch" by CNNGo in December 2009.

Yanyan Pang departed from the band in July 2009. Since then the band went on as a 4-piece with supporting from different bassists namely Vanilla Lau (aka Winnie Lau) (Tacit Closet, Noughts and Exes) and Alvin Lo. Kento Anything was then being recruited as bassist in February 2010.

Discography

Albums
The Underground: Something Alternative #1 (compilation) (20 September 2008)
21. Number One
22. Head To Toe

The King Lost His Pink (28 November 2009)
01. Child Heights
02. Tell Her (Laura I Love Her)
03. Number One
04. Let Her Go
05. Head To Toe
06. Till Late No May
07. 1 2 3 4 5 6 7 To You
08. Something Special
09. Caroline
10. Welcome to the Graveyard

"Good Night" (single) (26 May 2012)
01. Good Night
02. Good Night (instrumental)

A Tragedy Your Majesty (12 October 2013)
01. Gull up in the sky
02. 23
03. Sister
04. Higher Higher
05. The Band
06. K.L.L.S
07. Roll the dice
08. Love ain't red
09. Caroline (Tragic Version)
10. One O'clock
11. Get off my dance floor (feat. Ellen Joyce Loo)
12. Good Night

References
 Fitzpatrick, Liam (15 February 2010). "Loose Canon". Time. Review of The King Lost His Pink.
 Shamdasani, Pavan (21 October 2009). "Clockenflap Festival: Try a Little Grass". Time.
 CNNGo: The Hong Kong Hot List: 20 People to watch
 CNNGo: What's that sound? Chochukmo
 Bitetone: The King Lost His Pink Album Review 
Bitetone: The Pink Is Back: Chochukmo Interview

External links
 Official site
 Chochukmo on MySpace
 Chochukmo on Facebook
 Chochukmo's YouTube Channel

Hong Kong musical groups
Hong Kong music